The Venezuelan Declaration of Independence is a document drafted and adopted by Venezuelan on July 5, 1811, through which Venezuelans made the decision to separate from the Spanish Crown in order to establish a new nation based on the premises of equality of individuals, abolition of censorship and dedication to freedom of expression. These principles were enshrined as a constitutional principle for the new nation and were radically opposed to the political, cultural, and social practices that had existed during three hundred years of colonization.

Content 

Seven of the ten provinces belonging to the Captaincy General of Venezuela declared their independence and explained their reasons for this action, among them, that it was baneful that a small European nation ruled the great expanses of the New World, that Spanish America recovered its right to self-government after the abdications of Charles IV and Ferdinand VII at Bayonne, and that the political instability in Spain dictated that Venezuelans rule themselves, despite the brotherhood they shared with Spaniards. The seven provinces were Caracas Province, Cumaná Province, Barinas Province, Margarita Province, Barcelona Province, Mérida Province and Trujillo Province.

The three remaining provinces (Maracaibo Province, Coro Province and Guayana Province) did not take part in the Venezuelan congress opted to stay under Spanish rule.

The declaration proclaimed a new nation named the American Confederacy of Venezuela and was mainly written by Cristóbal Mendoza and  Juan Germán Roscio.

With this declaration, Venezuela became the first independent republic of Spanish America, and the fire of that declaration, fueled by external conflict, would spread the ideals of independence throughout all of the lands of Latin America.

Resolution 
On July 3, 1811, delegates from the first National Constituent Congress convened at the Santa Rosa de Lima Chapel in Caracas regarding the matter of independence. Two days later, the matter was resolved when Congress voted to officially declare independence 40-4. Then, with the permission of the secretary general, Francisco Isnardi, Mendoza and Roscio presented the document to Congress for discussion. Roscio and Isnardi then spoke following the reading of the declaration.

It was ratified by Congress on July 7, 1811 with 43 votes for and one vote against, and recorded in the Congress's Book of Minutes on August 17, 1811, in Caracas.

The anniversary of this declaration is celebrated as Independence Day. The original Book of Minutes of the first Congress of Venezuela is in the Federal Legislative Palace in Caracas.

The document is kept at the museo de la Casa de las Primeras Letras Simón Rodríguez. The signature of president Hugo Chávez was added to an exhibited copy of the document on May 31, 2013, by the Maduro administration,  as an homage to the former president. This resulted in outrage among various sectors opposing said administration.

See also

 Venezuelan Independence
 First Republic of Venezuela
 Solemn Act of the Declaration of Independence of Northern America
 Argentine Declaration of Independence

References

Colonial Venezuela
Independence of Venezuela
Declarations of independence
Viceroyalty of New Granada
1811 in international relations
1811 in Venezuela
1811 in the Viceroyalty of New Granada

Gran Colombia
History of Venezuela
Spain–Venezuela relations
July 1811 events
1811 documents